Farina Pao Paucar Franco (born 16 September 1986) known professionally as Farina, is a Colombian rapper, singer and songwritter. She is one of the pioneers of reggaeton music in Colombia and was the first woman to make reggaeton music in the country back in 2005. In 2017, she became the second Colombian artist signed by Jay-Z's label Roc Nation. She is currently managed by La Commission LLC.

She has hits such as "Mucho Pa Ti", "Así Así" (ft. Maluma), "A Fuego", "Como Una Kardashian", "Trakatá" and "Las Nenas".

Early years 
In 2005 she became known in the TV singing competition show X-Factor (Colombia) where she obtained the 3rd place. That same year she had her first commercial success on the radio with the song "Sólo con Palabras" (ft. Julio César Meza).

Musical career 
After a short hiatus, Farina returned to the show business in 2011 as the main character of the colombian series Tres Milagros. . She was nominated for "Best Colombian Actress" and "Revelation of the year" in the TVyNovelas Awards (Colombia). The show was broadcast in Panama, Venezuela, Ecuador, Dominican Republic, and the United States. She also wrote the song "Milagros Cruz", which was later included in her second album, Del Odio Al Amor.

2012 
In 2012, she released the album Del Odio Al Amor with 12 songs in written by her and produced by DJ Largo which included one of her biggest hits "Pongan atención" and the promotional singles "Money" and "Soñar No Cuesta Nada".

2013–2014 
In 2013 "Pongan Atención" made it into the top 10 of "Hot Rankings" on Latinoamerican TV music channel HTV. Shortly after she released "Pum Pum" feat. Ñengo Flow which quickly became a hit during 2014 and one of her biggest hits to date.

2015 
In 2015, Farina released the song, "Jala Jala" with Puerto Rican artist J Alvarez. In the music video, she showed her choreography skills. This same year she was nominated as Best Female Artist in the Heat Latin Music Awards along with Latin superstars Shakira and Gloria Trevi.

2016 
Farina had her first music contract with the american label La Commission and started a more commercial and professional era with singles such as "Si Ellos Supieran" (ft. Bryant Myers) and "Copas de Vino". For this new phase of her career she worked with Wyclef Jean and released 3 songs with him: "Casanova", "Hendrix Remix", and "Party Started". Wyclef Jean nominated her as Artist of Tomorrow for CBS and the Grammy Awards.

In 2017, Farina was signed to Jay Z's Roc Nation. Romeo Santos, CEO of the Latin division of the company, stated: "I was very impressed with her style. I heard three songs and I knew she had something special. I welcome Farina to the RocNation Latin family."

She released the single "Mejor Que Yo?" (Better Than Me?), a reggaeton pop song produced by duo A&X (Danza Kuduro). This song made it to the top 10 in the Urban charts in Colombia.  The song also charted well in Peru, El Salvador, and Guatemala. She closed the year with the singles "Todo", "El Problema" and "Mucho Pa' Ti", which became one of her biggest solo hits of her career.

2018–2020 
Farina performs in important international events like Radio City Music Hall in New York City with J Balvin, Luis Fonsi, Zion & Lenox, Jowel & Randy, and Nacho; the SXSW in Austin, the Viña del Mar International Song Festival and is the opening act of Romeo Santos' concerts in Denver, Phoenix, Los Angeles, Monterrey, Mexico City, Lima, Buenos Aires, and Santiago de Chile.

After Farina released 12 songs for streaming platforms only, Sony Music Latin announced Farina had been signed to the label on 27 May. "Farina is a true superstar in the making. we've admired her from afar for quite some time, and we're thrilled to join forces to help take her career to new heights," said Sony Music US Latin President, Nir Seroussi Urban Singer Farina Joins Sony Music US Latin & Romeo Santos Golden Tour.

Under Sony Music, Farina dropped the singles "Ego" and "Superarte" where she explores darker sounds and a greater influence of rap and R & B. In addition, Farina begins to gain prominence in the industry by participating in various songs featuring Latin artists such as Leslie Grace, Sech, Carlos Baute, Maluma, Fanny Lu, Sofia Reyes and Thalia. In January 2021, Romanian singer Inna's single "Read My Lips" (2020) featuring Farina reached number ten on the Romanian Airplay 100 chart.

Discography

Singles 
 2022: Adicta al Perreo
 2022: Fiesta - feat. Ryan Castro
 2022: Bendecido - feat. El Alfa
 2022: La Torta
 2022: La Hp - Spotify Singles
 2022: Flow Calle
 2021: Las Nenas (Natti Natasha, Farina, Cazzu, La Duraca)
 2021: La Boca (Ft. Arcangel)
 2020: Tick Tock (With Thalía and Sofía Reyes)
 2020: Ten Cuidao (With Thalía)
 2020: Estoy Soltera (With Leslie Shaw and Thalía)
 2020: A Fuego
 2020: Dale Cintura (Kuliki) (Ft. Steve Aoki, Darell, and Play N Skillz)
 2020: Muy Mal (Ft. El Micha)
 2019: Así Así (Ft. Maluma)
 2019: Fariana (Ft. Blueface)
 2019: Olvídame
 2019: Como Una Kardashian
 2019: Perras Como Tú (Ft. Tokischa)
 2018: Superarte (Ft. Miky Woodz)
 2018: Ego
 2017: Mucho Pa' Ti
 2017: Mejor Que Yo
 2017: El Problema
 2017: Todo
 2016: Copas de Vino
 2016: Si Ellos Supieran (Ft. Bryant Myers)
 2015: Mari
 2015: Jala Jala (Ft. J Alvarez)
 2014: Apágame
 2013: Pum Pum (Ft. Ñengo Flow)
 2013: Ácido (Ft. Rayo y Toby)
 2012: Pongan Atención
 2012: Soñar No Cuesta Nada (Official Remix) (Ft. Jowell & Randy)
 2012: Money
 2012: Soñar no Cuesta Nada
 2009: Hasta el Final
 2007: ¿Será? (Ft. Julio César Meza)
 2006: Regresa a Mi
 2005: Sólo con Palabras (Ft. Julio César Meza)

Songs as featured artist 
 2023: Adicto - Yandel and Farina
 2022: Barbie Spotify Singles - Rebecca ft. Dulce Maria, Mc Danny, Farina
 2021: Cuanto – Duki ft. Lucho SSJ and Farina
 2020: Read My Lips – Inna featuring Farina
 2020: Dale Cintura (Kuliki) – Darell, Farina, Play-N-Skillz, Steve Akoi, Kiko el Crazy, Toño Rosario
 2019: Puesto Pa' Ti – Maluma ft. Farina
 2019: Te Quedaste Solo – Fanny Lu, Farina
 2019: Involucrado – Andy Rivera ft. Farina
 2019: Alma Desnuda Remix – Catalyna ft. Farina
 2019: Compro Minutos – Carlos Baute ft. Farina
 2019: De Lunes a Jueves – Leslie Grace, Farina
 2018: Otra Copa – Pla N' Skills, De La Ghetto, Farina
 2018: En Tu Colchón o El Mio – Abraham Mateo ft. Farina
 2018: Ojalá – Sech ft, Farina y Mozart La Para
 2018: Caprichosa (Remix)- Beatriz Luengo ft. Mala Rodriguez & Farina
 2018: Bad Gyal – Pipe Calderón ft. Farina
 2018: Carbon Sport – Lary Over, Farruko, Farina, Químico Ultra Mega
 2017: Parcera – Tomas the Latin Boy ft. Farina
 2017: MARI REMIX – Farina Ft. Honorebel, El Micha & Pocho
 2017: Party Started (Wyclef Jean Ft. Farina)
 2016: Hendrix Spanglish Remix (Wyclef Jean Ft. Farina, Bryant Myers & Anonimus)
 2016: Imagínate – Alex Roy Ft. Farina
 2010: Quedate Conmigo – Echate Pa' ca (Juachito Ft.. Farina)
 2010: Perdiendo el Control (Hety & Zambo Ft. Farina)
 2010: Contigo (Ron Bass feat. Farina)
 2010: Yo Soy De La Calle (Shungu Ft. Farina)
 2009: Vas an Extrañarme (Pipe Calderón Ft. Farina)
 2006: Caliente (Dj Buxxi Ft. Farina)

Albums 
 2021: FloWres (ft. Arcangel)
 2012: Del Odio Al Amor

References 

1986 births
Living people
Colombian reggaeton musicians
Colombian people of Chinese descent
Colombian people of Peruvian descent
Colombian people of Lebanese descent
Women in Latin music
Sony Music Latin artists